Wiki Conference India is a national Wikipedia conference organised in India. The first Wiki Conference India conference was held in November 2011, in Mumbai, the capital of the Indian state of Maharashtra. It was organised by the Mumbai Wikipedia community in partnership with Wikimedia India Chapter
 with the support of the Wikimedia Foundation. The conference is positioned as the annual national flagship event for Wikimedia in India and is open to participation from citizens of all nations. The focus is on matters concerning India on Wikipedia projects and other sister projects in English and other Indian folk languages. WikiConference India 2023 will take place in Hyderabad from 28 to 30 April 2023.

Wiki Conference India 2011
The first WikiIndia Conference was held in Mumbai between 18 and 20 November 2011.

Overview
WikiConference India aims to provide a common platform for all Indian Wikimedians to interact, share ideas and collaborate. The conference ran from the 18 to 20 November 2011 and was held in Mumbai University in South Mumbai with the largest talks being held in the University's historic convocation hall.

Speakers

The conference was inaugurated by a keynote addresses by Jimmy Wales. Arnab Goswami spoke on "Neutrality", he was an invited guest speaker. Barry Newstead spoke on the last day.

Tracks
Tracks showcased in the Conference included topics such as Wikipedia Impact, Gender Gap, Indic Language wiki track, MediaWiki Translation Sprint, Institutions and Wikipedia, Fair use Workshop, etc. It also included Editathon and WikiAcademy sessions.

Sessions

Various sessions on topics such as:
 Free knowledge and free content
 Legal Aspects of Wiki Culture
 Usage of Ajax and jQuery in Wiki
 Wiki Bhasha: Our Experiences with Multilingual Content
 Wiki Women Web: Bridging the Gender Gap
 GLAM (Galleries, libraries, archives and museums) project initiation in indic language Wikipedias

Concurrent with the conference was a Hackathon, hosted by the Maharashtra Chamber of Commerce, Industry and Agriculture (MACCIA) Kala Ghoda, South Mumbai. Other activities included a City Tour and a Heritage Walk.

Participants
Wikimedians and non Wikimedians from all over India and from other countries, Wikimedia Foundation staff and co-founder A hundred applicants got scholarships based on their experience and contribution to Wikipedia and other projects. More than 700 people attended the conference.

Sponsors and partners

Microsoft Research, Omidyar Network, Kalnirnay, Yebhi.com, were the sponsors; while eRegNow.com, Avignyata Inc., Kores India Ltd., Text100, Digital Signage Networks (DSN) and Panache were the partners.

There was a demonstration outside the conference by protesters against the map used by Wikipedia to show the borders of India.

WikiConference India 2016 

The second Wiki Conference India has been held in Mohali city of Punjab State near Chandigarh.  The venue of the Conference was CGC Landhran . Katherine Maher, Executive Director of WMF and Nataliia Tymkiv, Board Member of WMF attended this conference.

WikiConference India 2023 
WCI 2023 is a national-level conference that provides a common platform for Wikimedians and stakeholders interested in Indic-language Wikimedia projects and other aspects of the movement in India and a few South Asian regions. This is a space to meet, connect, share stories, learnings, best practices, and challenges, and discuss the future strategy of our region. The conference will take place in Hyderabad from 28 to 30 April 2023.

Gallery

WikiConference India 2011

WikiConference India 2016

WikiConference India 2023

See also
 WikiSym
 Wikimania
 WikiConference North America
 Wiki Indaba

References

External links

 "Wiki Conference India 2011" at Meta-Wiki, a Wikimedia project coordination wiki
"Allconferencealert" Find upcoming conferences of your choice
"Conference Next" Upcoming Conferences
"Conferences Daily" Get Conference Alerts on daily basis
 "Wikipedia eyes India for language growth" Agence France-Presse 9 November 2011
 "WikiConference comes to town" Times of India 10 November 2011
 "Wiki-world targets India " Asia Times Online 19 November 2011
 "Wikipedia needs inputs in local languages" Business Standard 18 November 2011

Wikimedia Foundation
Wikimedia India
Wiki-related conferences
Wikipedia
Wikipedia in India